Solomon Alami was a Portuguese-Jewish ethical writer of  the 14th and 15th centuries, contemporary of Simon ben Ẓemaḥ Duran (רשב"ץ). He is known through his ethical treatise Iggeret Musar, (Why Catastrophes Come) which he addressed, in the form of a letter, to one of his disciples in 1415.

Iggeret Musar 
Alami was an eye-witness of the persecutions of the Jews of Catalonia, Castile, and Aragon in 1391. Alami considers these and other severe trials inflicted upon the Spanish Jews as the effect of, and a punishment for, the moral and religious decadence into which his co-religionists had fallen; and he holds before his brethren a mirror of the moral degeneration extending through all circles of Jewish society.  He says in his book:

The Hebrew style of the letter is dignified and impassioned, and its moral admonition reveals the noble courage of Alami. Each section of the Iggeret Musar is preceded by a Biblical verse suggesting its contents.

Zunz published an abridged German language translation of part of it in Busch's Jahrbuch für Israeliten, iv. (Vienna, 1844), and this also appeared in his Gesammelte Schriften, ii. 177. An earlier edition appeared in Venice in 1712, as Iggeret ha-Ḥokmah weha-Emunah (Letter on Wisdom and Faith); but the name of the author was corrupted to Solomon ben Laḥmi. The best edition now extant (c.1906) of Alami's work is that issued by Jellinek (Vienna, 1872). Extracts of the Iggeret are given in Or ha-Ḥayyim of Joseph Jaabez and in I.S. Reggio's Ha-Torah weha-Philosophia. On the name Alami, see Steinschneider, Jew. Quart. Rev. xi. 486.

References

External links 
Jewish Encyclopedia article on Solomon Alami, by Samuel Baeck.

15th-century Portuguese rabbis
14th-century Portuguese rabbis
14th-century Portuguese writers
15th-century Portuguese writers